Battlescombe is an area in the village of Bisley in Gloucestershire, England.

References

Villages in Gloucestershire
Stroud District